Kate Yeo (born 2001) is a youth climate activist from Singapore.

Activism

Climate 
In 2018, Kate started a campaign BYO Bottle SG to advocate against single-use plastics in Singapore. The initiative has worked with 231 drink stalls and reached out to close to 10,000 people. She also achieved 2nd Prize in the Goi Peace Foundation International Essay Contest for Young People for her essay titled “The Battle Against Plastic Pollution”.

She was one of the organisers of the We The Planet climate strikes for Earth Day 2020. She then co-founded Re-Earth Initiative, an international youth-led NGO striving to make the climate movement more accessible to all. She also helped to organise the Virtual Youth Environment Assembly, organised by the U.N. Environmental Programme’s youth constituency.

In April 2021, she was a panellist at the Othering & Belonging Summit, alongside writer and climate activist Naomi Klein and other youth advocates Tokata Iron Eyes, Xiye Bastida and Samia Dumbuya.

Kate has actively spoken out on the need for stronger inclusion of Southeast Asian youths in the climate movement.

COVID-19 Initiative 
During the pandemic, Kate started an initiative to support local hawkers in Singapore. Her family purchased bulk orders of food and drinks which were given to residents at a halfway house.

References 

Youth climate activists
Singaporean environmentalists
Singaporean women environmentalists
2001 births
Living people